Williamsville is an unincorporated community in Attala County, Mississippi, United States.

References

Unincorporated communities in Attala County, Mississippi
Unincorporated communities in Mississippi